Ian Hayden (born 14 April 1941) is a former Australian rules footballer who played with Richmond in the Victorian Football League (VFL).

Hayden was one of the leading players in the Victorian Amateur Football Association before he came to Richmond, winning the Woodrow Medal in 1960, while playing for the University Blues.

A follower and key position player, he kicked 17 goals from 13 appearances for Richmond in 1962, his debut season. He bettered that tally in 1963, with 25 goals from 15 games, enough to top Richmond's goal-kicking. This included a personal best six goal haul, against South Melbourne at Lake Oval, one of just seven wins that he participated in over the course of his career.

He badly injured himself in the second round of the 1964 VFL season, against Essendon, when he tore ligaments in his knee. After having a cartilage operation, Hayden returned to training in 1965 but broke down during a practise match in April. He was advised to stay off the football field for the rest of the year, in order to resume his career in 1966, fully recovered. It however didn't work out and he was forced to retire.

References

1941 births
Australian rules footballers from Victoria (Australia)
Richmond Football Club players
University Blues Football Club players
Living people